Daniel Winkler can refer to:

 Dan Winkler (born 1990), American baseball player
 Daniel Winkler (gymnast) (born 1962), German Olympic gymnast
 Daniel Winkler (knifemaker), American knifemaker
 Daniel Winkler (rower) (born 1959), Swiss Olympic rower